Scott Ford may refer to:

Scott Ford (ice hockey) (born 1979), Canadian ice hockey player 
Scott Ford (musician), American bassist, vocalist, and arranger
Scott T. Ford, president and chief executive officer of Alltel

See also
Duncan Scott-Ford